Why Announce Your Marriage? is a 1922 American silent comedy drama film directed by Alan Crosland and starring Elaine Hammerstein, Niles Welch and Arthur Housman.

Cast
 Elaine Hammerstein as Arline Mayfair 
 Niles Welch as Jimmy Winthrop 
 Frank Currier as David Mayfair 
 Arthur Housman as Teddy Filbert 
 James Harrison as Bobby Kingsley 
 Florence Billings as Widow Gushing 
 Marie Burke as Mrs. Jerome 
 Huntley Gordon as Mr. Walton 
 Elizabeth Woodmere as Gladys Jerome

References

Bibliography
 Monaco, James. The Encyclopedia of Film. Perigee Books, 1991.

External links

1922 films
Silent American comedy films
Films directed by Alan Crosland
American silent feature films
1920s English-language films
American black-and-white films
Selznick Pictures films
1922 comedy films
1920s American films